The 1955 PGA Championship was the 37th PGA Championship, held July 20–26 in Michigan at Meadowbrook Country Club in Northville Township, northwest of nearby Detroit. Doug Ford won the match play championship, 4 & 3 over Cary Middlecoff in the Tuesday final; the winner's share was $5,000 and the runner-up earned $3,000. This was the first of two major titles for Ford, who won the Masters in 1957.

Ford was also the medalist in the stroke-play qualifying with a 135 (−7), worth $250 and the Alex Smith trophy. He was the fourth to win the final match after winning the qualifier, joining Walter Hagen (1926), Olin Dutra (1932), and Byron Nelson  (1945). Ford was the last medalist, as the format was changed in 1956 to seven rounds without a qualifier for two years, then to 72-hole stroke play in 1958.

Defending champion Chick Harbert, a local resident, was defeated in the second round by Johnny Palmer, 1 up. No former champion advanced past the second round. 

The 1947 edition, in which Harbert was runner-up, was also held in the Detroit area.

Format
The match play format at the PGA Championship in 1955 called for 12 rounds (216 holes) in seven days:
 Wednesday and Thursday – 36-hole stroke play qualifier, 18 holes per day;
defending champion Chick Harbert and the top 63 professionals advanced to match play
 Friday – first two rounds, 18 holes each
 Saturday – third round – 36 holes
 Sunday – quarterfinals – 36 holes
 Monday – semifinals – 36 holes
 Tuesday – final – 36 holes

Past champions in the field

Failed to qualify

Source:

Final results
Tuesday, July 26, 1955

Final eight bracket

Final match scorecards
Morning

Afternoon

Source:

References

External links
PGA Media Guide 2012
GolfCompendium.com – 1955 PGA Championship
PGA.com – 1955 PGA Championship 

PGA Championship
Golf in Michigan
PGA Championship
PGA Championship
PGA Championship
PGA Championship